Michael Picken (born 8 October 1954) is an Australian judoka. He competed in the men's lightweight event at the 1980 Summer Olympics.

References

External links
 

1954 births
Living people
Australian male judoka
Olympic judoka of Australia
Judoka at the 1980 Summer Olympics
Place of birth missing (living people)